A Bach Temperament is supposed to be the way that the composer Johann Sebastian Bach himself, should have tuned his harpsichords and clavichords, for the interpretation among others, of his masterpiece Das wohltemperirte Clavier (1722 / 1740-1742).

There exists no certainty on how this temperament is structured, for Bach did not leave any written instruction on how he tuned. He was famous for being able to tune his keyboard in a swift and easy way, but it is not clear how. It should also be kept in mind that Bach's musical education was based on the meantone, the "dominating" keyboard tuning during the Baroque period (ca. 1600 to ca. 1750).

Interpretations 
The probably oldest source is the publication in 1753 of Versuch über die wahre Art das Clavier zu spielen by Carl Philipp Emanuel Bach. This work describes how to tune the fifths slightly different from purity, accompanied by an aural control of major and minor thirds, and full chords, so that one can play clean in all twenty-four keys. It is clear from the description that it concerns a purely auditory way of tuning, but this prescription is not sufficiently conclusive to arrive at an unambiguous reconstruction of the prescribed temperament.

Johann Kirnberger published Die Kunst des reinen Satzes in der Musik in 1771. As a student of Bach, he claims to follow Bach's teachings. However, this source also does not offer full certainty on how Bach tuned his keyboard.

Friedrich Wilhelm Marpurg published in 1776 Versuch über die musikalische Temperatur. He propones that Bach would have applied the equal temperament (12TET). This hypothesis has been widely adopted in many publications, but the vast majority of scientific publications in this field no longer support this hypothesis since Kelletat (1960).

Johann Nikolaus Forkel publishes in 1802 Über Johann Sebastian Bach's Leben, Kunst und Kunstwerke. Also Forkel, who was good friends with Bach's sons and therefore an important source of information, does not indicate exactly how Bach tuned the keyboard. Forkel knew from correspondence with Kirnberger that the latter did not agree at all with his former student Marpurg.

Robert Holford Macdowall Bosanquet (1876) questioned whether Bach would have applied the equal temperament.

Herbert Kelletat (1960) suggests that Kirnberger III would have been Bach's temperament, or any other similar temperament.

Sparschuh A., a mathematician, is the first to propose a hypothesis for a Bach tuning in 1998, based on a row of decorative curls above the title of Das wohltemperirte Clavier. His hypothesis leads to an alternative diapason, is thus uncertain, and afterwards he therefor has proposed a number of successive alternatives.

Harpsichordist Bradley Lehman published an alternative hypothesis in 2005, also based on a row of decorative curls above the title of Das wohltemperierte Klavier. In this way he constructed another possible tuning method. This idea also prompted others, such as John O'Donnell and John Francis, to adopt their own interpretation of the 'curls', and thus alternative temperaments.

The harpsichord manufacturer Jobin E. published in 2005 a hypothesis with two pure major thirds, and three unconventionally very slightly augmented fifths (those on A-flat, E-flat and B-flat). This configuration of fifths leads to a very good match of the characteristics of the fifths with the characteristics of the corresponding curls on the Bach figure.

The precise definition of the Bach tuning still remains unclear. The only certainty has become that it must be 'well-tempered', and preferably not the equal temperament.

Bibliography 

 Bach C. Ph. E. (1753) :	Versuch über die wahre Art das Clavier zu spielen. Enleitung. Pag. 10, § 14.
 Kirnberger J. (1771) : "Die Kunst des reinen Satzes in der Musik" (ISBN 3-48701-875-6). This book indicates which properties according to Bach were desirable for a good temperament, but not how these are concretely implemented according to Bach on the basis of tuning instructions.
 Marpurg F. (1776) : "Versuch über die musikalische Temperatur" (ISBN 0-36408-671-8). He suggests the equal temperament (12TET) was applied by Bach.
 Forkel J. N. (1802) : Über Johann Sebastian Bachs Leben, Kunst und Kunstwerke. Chapter III. Pag. 17.
 Kelletat H. (1966) : "Zur musikalischen Temperatur, I. Johann Sebastian Bach und seine Zeit" (1960, 1981, ISBN 3-87537-156-9). He suggests that Kirnberger III, or any similar temperament, or his own proposal (1966), could have been applied.
 Kellner H. (1977) : "Eine Rekonstruktion der wohltemperierten Stimmung von Johann Sebastian Bach" (Das Musikinstrument 26/1, p. 33–35).
 Barnes J. (1979–4)
 Billeter B. (1979) : "Anweisung zum Stimmen von Tasteninstrumenten in verschiedenen Temperaturen" (ISBN 3-87537-160-7).
 Lindley M. (1994) : "A Quest for Bach's Ideal Style of Organ Temperament" (M. Lustig, ed., Stimmungen im 17. und 18. Jahrhundert, Michaelstein, 1997)
 Sparschuh A. (1998) : "Stimm– Arithmetic des wohltemperierten Klaviers von J. S. Bach" (Deutsche Mathematiker Vereinigung, Jahrestagung 1999, Mainz, S. 154–155). This is probably the first approach to reconstruct a Bach–Temperament on the basis of a curled figure, drawn by J. S. Bach, at the top of a score of "Das wohltemerirte Clavier", as shown in the figure above. He reworked his proposal in a series of varying interpretations.
 Jira M. (2000) : "Musikalische Temperaturen und Musikalischer Satz in der Klaviermusik von J. S. Bach" (2000, Hans Schneider – Tutzing, ISBN 3-79521-004-6).
 Zapf M. (2001) : harpsichord expert, "Handing down the Tradition: The survival of Bach's Finger Technique in an Obscure Nineteeht-Century Clavier Tutor". (De Clavicordio V, sept. 2001, p. 39-44), it is an updated proposal based on Sparschuh
 Francis J. C. (2004–6) : "The Keyboard Temperament of J. S. Bach" (Eunomios). Inspired by Sparschuh.
 Lehman B. (2005–2) : "Bach’s extraordinary temperament: our Rosetta Stone – 1 ; – 2" (Early Music, vol. 33, No 1, Feb 2005, p. 3-23 ; vol. 33, No 2, May 2005 p. 211-231). Inspired by an interpretation of the Bach curls, different from the interpretation by Sparschuh.
 Allain–Dupré P. (2005) : "Justesses et Tempéraments" (academis.edu) variant of the Lehman proposal
 Francis J. C. (2005–2) : "The Esoteric Keyboard Temperaments of J. S. Bach", New interpretation based on Sparschuh (Eunomios)
 Jencka D.: Letter to Early Music (2005–8, p. 545), a reply to Lehman
 Jobin E. (2005–8) : "BACH et le Clavier bien Tempéré" (website of "Clavecin en France"). Inspired on a new interpretation of the Bach scrolls, based on cent calculations.
 Maunder R. (2005–8) : Letter to Early Music (2005–8, p. 545–546), a reply to Lehman
 Mobbs K., MacKenzie A. (2005–8) : Letter to Early Music (2005–8, p. 546–547), a reply to Lehman
 Lucktenberg G. (2005–12) : short article "Light Reading for the Winter", in Newsletter of Southeastern Historical Keyboard Society (SEHKS),
 Francis J. C. (2005–7, 2006) : "Das Wohltemperirte Clavier, Pitch, Tuning and Temperament Design", a revision of his first proposal of 2004 (Eunomios)
 O'Donnell J. (2006–11) : "Bach's temperament, Occam's razor, and the Neidhardt factor" (Early Music, 2006–11, p. 625-633)
 Lindley M., Ortgies I. (2006–11) : "Bach style keyboard tuning" (Early Music, 2006–11, p. 613-623).
 Lehman B. (2006–4) : "Bach’s Art of Temperament" (Website of Microstick)
 Spanyi M. (2006) : "Kirnberger's Temperament and its Use in Today's Musical Praxis" (Clavichord international – 11 (2007-5), 1, Seite 15–22)
 Interbartolo G., Venturino P. (2007-07) : ‘BACH 1722, "Il temperamento de Dio" (ISBN A000068628)
 Billeter B. (2008-3) : "Zur 'Wohltemperirten' Stimmung von Johann Sebastian Bach: Wie hat Bach seine Cembali gestimmt?" (Ars Organi Zeitschrift, 2008–3, p. 18-21).
 Di Veroli C. (2008–11) : "Unequal Temperaments: Theory, History and Practice" (e-book) 
 Amiot E. (2008) : "Discrete Fourier Transform and Bach’s Good Temperament"

References 

Johann Sebastian Bach
Musicology